Exter may refer to:

Exter (Vlotho), a village near Vlotho in Germany
Exter (Weser), a tributary of the river Weser in Germany
Exter (surname)
Extince or Exter-O-naldus or De Exter (born 1967), Dutch language rapper

See also 
Exter Formation